Gergana Kochanova (born c. 1985) is a Bulgarian model who was the first runner-up in the Miss Bulgaria 2007 contest. She represented Bulgaria in Miss Universe 2007 (Mexico City, Mexico.)

References

External links
miss bulgaria 2007 Gergana
Pageant news, Bulgaria

Living people
1980s births
Miss Universe 2007 contestants
Bulgarian female models
Bulgarian beauty pageant winners